Carol Kidd MBE (born 19 October 1945) is a Scottish jazz singer.

Kidd was born in Glasgow, Scotland. She came to prominence in the mid-1970s, as the vocalist in the band led by vibraphonist / saxophonist Jimmy Feighan. In 1990, she released her award-winning album The Night We Called It a Day. She has subsequently performed and recorded extensively on her own. She has won several awards at the British Jazz Awards. In 1998, she was appointed an MBE.

Discography
 Carol Kidd (Aloi, 1984)
 All My Tomorrows (Aloi, 1985)
 Nice Work (Linn, 1987)
 The Night We Called It a Day (Linn, 1990)
 I'm Glad We Met (Linn, 1991)
 Crazy for Gershwin (Linn, 1994)
 That's Me (Linn, 1995)
 A Singer for All Seasons (Jazz Arena, 1998)
 A Place in My Heart (Jazz Arena, 1999)
 Debut (Linn, 2004)
 Dreamsville (Linn, 2008)
 Tell Me Once Again (Linn, 2010)
 Auld Lang Syne (Aurora Music, 2015)

References

Further reading
Young, Andrew. "Watch This!; Bull's Kidd". The Glasgow Herald. 2 December 1978.
Crumley, James. "A Whole Lot of Jazz - But Still Not Enough". The Glasgow Herald. 31 March 1989. (Begin at last paragraph, next-to-last column.)
Young, Andrew. "Bubble Of Jazz Effervescence Is Taking London By Storm". The Glasgow Herald. 16 June 1979.
Batchelor, David. "Third Eye Centre, Glasgow: Jazz". The Glasgow Herald. 22 October 1981.
Batchelor, David. "Ronnie Scott's, London: Carol Kidd". The Glasgow Herald. 10 March 1982.
Batchelor, David. "Third Eye Centre, Glasgow: Martin Taylor and Carol Kidd". The Glasgow Herald. 2 December 1982.
Young, Andrew. "Singer Takes Plunge". The Glasgow Herald. 8 December 1984.
Mathieson, Kenny. "Queen's Hall, Edinburgh: Carol Hall". The Glasgow Herald. 30 March 1987.
Meadow, Elliot. "Theatre Royal, Glasgow: Carol Hall". The Glasgow Herald. 4 July 1987.
Meadow, Elliot. "Mitchell Theatre, Glasgow: Carol Hall". The Glasgow Herald. 30 June 1988.
Adams, Rob. "The Jazz Singer Puts Career Back In Full Swing". The Glasgow Herald. 23 June 1989.
Buie, Elizabeth. "Theatre Royal, Glasgow: Carol Kidd and Humphrey Lyttleton". The Glasgow Herald. 23 June 1989.
Wilson, Caroline. "Singer Carol Kidd Recovers from Breast Cancer". The Evening Times. 16 June 2013.

External links
 Linn Records - Carol Kidd

1945 births
Living people
Scottish jazz singers
Members of the Order of the British Empire
British women jazz singers
Musicians from Glasgow